Thomas Buck Reed (May 7, 1787November 26, 1829) was a United States senator from Mississippi.

Biography

Early life
Thomas Buck Reed was born on May 7, 1787 near Lexington, Kentucky. He attended the public schools and the College of New Jersey (now Princeton University.) He studied law and was admitted to the bar.

Career
He commenced legal practice in Lexington in 1808. In 1809, he moved to Natchez, Mississippi and served as a city clerk in 1811. He was an unsuccessful candidate for Delegate to Congress in 1813, and was attorney general of Mississippi from 1821 to 1826. 
His party affiliation was Jacksonian.

In 1825, he was elected to the Mississippi House of Representatives but declined to take his seat; he was elected to the U.S. Senate to fill the vacancy caused by the resignation of David Holmes and served from January 28, 1826, to March 3, 1827. He was an unsuccessful candidate for reelection in 1827, but was again elected to the Senate in 1828 and served from March 4, 1829.

Personal life
He married Margaret Allison Ross (1787–1838), the daughter of plantation owner Isaac Ross (1760–1836).

Death
He died on November 26, 1829 in Lexington, Kentucky. He was buried in the Old Baptist Cemetery.

See also
List of United States Congress members who died in office (1790–1899)

References

External links 

1787 births
1829 deaths
Politicians from Lexington, Kentucky
American people of Irish descent
Mississippi Jacksonians
Jacksonian United States senators from Mississippi
Mississippi Attorneys General 
Politicians from Natchez, Mississippi
Princeton University alumni
19th-century American politicians
19th-century American lawyers